Boris Cmiljanić (born 17 March 1996) is a Montenegrin professional footballer who plays as a forward for FK Dečić.

Club career

Budućnost Podgorica
After spending years in the club's youth system, Cmiljanić made his professional debut with Budućnost Podgorica at the age of 16. At the beginning of the 2013-14 season, he was sidelined for three months due to injury.

PSV
On June 16, 2014, it was announced that Cmiljanić signed with PSV Eindhoven on a three-year contract after several trials and negotiations. He made his professional debut as Jong PSV player in the second division on 9 August 2014 against Achilles '29. He replaced Elvio van Overbeek after 77 minutes in a 2–0 home win.

Huesca
On 4 July 2016, Cmiljanić signed a three-year contract with Spanish Segunda División side Huesca, as a free agent. He made his debut for the club on 20 August, in a 0–0 away draw against Alcorcón.

On 15 January 2017, after appearing rarely, Cmiljanić was loaned to Segunda División B club Atlético Levante UD until June. On 14 September, he cut ties with the club.

Slovan

Admira Wacker
On 2 August 2019, he joined Austrian club Admira Wacker on loan with a purchase option.

Honours
Budućnost Podgorica
Montenegrin Cup: 2012–13

Slovan Bratislava
Fortuna Liga: 2018–19
Slovak Cup: 2017–18

References

External links

Profile - PSV

1996 births
Living people
People from Bijelo Polje
Association football forwards
Montenegrin footballers
Montenegro youth international footballers
Montenegro under-21 international footballers
FK Budućnost Podgorica players
Jong PSV players
SD Huesca footballers
Atlético Levante UD players
ŠK Slovan Bratislava players
FC Admira Wacker Mödling players
FC ViOn Zlaté Moravce players
FK Sarajevo players
Montenegrin First League players
Eerste Divisie players
Segunda División players
Segunda División B players
Slovak Super Liga players
Austrian Football Bundesliga players
Premier League of Bosnia and Herzegovina players
Montenegrin expatriate footballers
Expatriate footballers in the Netherlands
Montenegrin expatriate sportspeople in the Netherlands
Expatriate footballers in Spain
Montenegrin expatriate sportspeople in Spain
Expatriate footballers in Slovakia
Montenegrin expatriate sportspeople in Slovakia
Expatriate footballers in Austria
Montenegrin expatriate sportspeople in Austria
Expatriate footballers in Bosnia and Herzegovina
Montenegrin expatriate sportspeople in Bosnia and Herzegovina